Ahmad Shariatzadeh (born July 1, 2002) is an Iranian footballer who plays as a left winger for Iranian club Sanat Naft in the Persian Gulf Pro League.

Club career

Sanat Naft
He made his debut for Sanat Naft Abadan in last fixtures of 2018–19 Iran Pro League against Saipa while he substituted in for Taleb Reykani.

Honours

International 
Iran U19
 CAFA Junior Championship 2019

References

Living people
2002 births
Association football midfielders
Iranian footballers
Sanat Naft Abadan F.C. players
People from Abadan, Iran
Sportspeople from Khuzestan province